Heart Attack is 2014 Indian Telugu-language romantic action thriller film written, directed and produced by Puri Jagannadh under the banner Puri Jagannadh Touring Talkies. The film stars Nithiin and Adah Sharma, with Nicole Amy Madell in an extended cameo appearance and Vikramjeet Virk as the antagonist. Anoop Rubens composed the soundtrack for the film. The film released on 31 January 2014 worldwide to mixed to positive reviews from the critics, but was a commercial success, grossing  in fifty days.

Plot
In Goa, Makrand Kamati, a crime boss along with his henchmen, kidnaps a girl at the beach and turning her into a slave for sale after injecting opium into her. When a cop named Madhusudhan catches the slaves and drug racket, Makarand and his henchman interfere with him while speaking to the media, where they injure Madhusudhan and turn him into an immobile person.

A year later, Varun is a hippie vagabond wandering all over the world. He lost his parents in his childhood when he was in USA. Calling himself a free soul, Varun never believes in relationships and earns his living by working in part-time jobs in a  classified advertising website named Craigslist and rests at nights on the roads with some kitchen equipment to cook food. At Spain, Varun comes across an Indian named Hayathi, who arrived to Spain to meet her friend Priya.

In order to capture her attention, Varun pretends to suffer with a heart attack and later takes her phone number, but doesn't learn her name. Hayathi came to Spain to convince Priya's father, ISKCON Ramana, a staunch Krishna devotee who hates love marriages to accept her relationship with Haridas, an African musician. After much chasing and teasing, Varun asks Hayathi to give him a kiss, for which she slaps him. Thus he keeps a stipulation that if Varun makes Ramana accept the marriage of the lovers, Hayathi has to kiss him.

Varun wins the challenge, and as per stipulation, Hayathi has to kiss him. On a separate note, Varun also exposes Makarand's drug racket. After thrashing Makarand's men Ammu and others at the arena, Varun and Hayathi kiss for a one hour duration, but the kiss had a condition from Hayathi. When Varun asks for the condition, Hayathi tells that Varun should never meet her at any cost as she is heartbroken since she was madly in love with Varun, but he has no belief in relationships. Varun leaves for Romania, where he meets a girl Chitrangada, who has a similar mindset.

After spending time with Chitrangada, Varun realizes that he is indeed in love with Hayathi. After getting a strong moral support from Chitrangada, Varun desperately goes to Priya's house, where he finds a slip in which it is written that Hayathi is in Goa. When he reaches Goa, with the help of a Rajinikanth fan, a mobile food selling trader, Varun tracks down Hayathi and meets her, but he faces a strong rejection from Hayati. Varun desperately tries to speak with her, but Makarand, Ammu and his men arrive and intervene, saying that Hayathi is Makarand's would-be wife.

Actually, Hayati is Madhusudhan's daughter, and in order to meet the expenses of her father's medication, Hayathi accepts the marriage with Makarand, without knowing the fact that Makarand was the reason behind her father's hospitalization. Varun kills Ammu and talks with Makarand as he discovers this and slaps Hayathi for hiding the reason to part with him. She replies that her problems would ruin Varun's happiness which he enjoys as a free soul. Varun needs  for Madhusudhan's operation, where he meets Prakash Raj, an influential businessman who offers  to Varun and asks him to save his daughter, who is kidnapped by Makarand as a part of his slave trade.

Varun enters Makarand's den, where he learns that Hayathi is also going to be a part of Makarand's trade, and already drugs are injected into her. While Varun is fighting with Makarand and his men, he is injected with a drug, and before losing consciousness, Varun slits Makarand's throat with a blade and kills him. Madhusudhan recovers from his injuries, and Prakash Raj is happy with his daughter reaching him safely. Varun and Hayathi reconcile and is seen planning their honeymoon after receiving flight trip tickets and money from Prakash Raj.

Cast
 Nithiin as Varun, Hayati's love interest
 Adah Sharma as Hayati, Varun's love interest
 Vikramjeet Virk as Makarand Kamati
 Nicole Amy Madell as Chitrangada
 Ali as Rajnikanth's fan
 Brahmanandam as ISKCON Ramana, Priya and Shriya's father
 Kesha Khambhati as Priya
 Tejaswi Madivada as Shriya, Priya's sister
 Ajay as Amu, Makarand's henchman
 Devan as Madhusudhan, Hayati's father
 Pavitra Lokesh as Hayati's mother
 Ajaz Khan as Makrand's henchman
 Ambati Srinivas
 Prakash Raj as himself in a special appearance
Khushi Mukherjee as Ali's girlfriend

Production 
Nithiin grew his hair longer for the film.

Reception 
The Times of India gave a review stating, "The cinematography and music is what makes it seem much better than it really is. The visuals are breathtakingly beautiful. ... you'll be fine as long as you don't try to make sense of it all" and rated the film 3/5. Bangalore Mirror gave a review stating "If you are watching this film, then you can be sure of not getting a heart attack though you may be at the risk of having a headache. We really wonder if it's the same Puri Jagannadh who came up with a film like Heart Attack. Leave the story, there is hardly any comedy despite Ali trying his routine comedy strip, the even punch dialogues seem to have gone for a toss." Oneindia Entertainment gave a review stating, "Puri Jagannadh has opted for a routine romance drama, but he has written an engaging screenplay for Heart Attack, which has fare amount of twists and turns to keep you glued on to the screen. The director, who is master in making formulaic movies, managed to include commercial ingredients like romance, action, comedy, dialogues and family drama, which will definitely impress all classes of audience." and rated the film 3/5. IndiaGlitz gave a review stating "'Heart Attack' hit the screens as a favorite this season. The film doesn't disappoint and lives up to the expectations. An entertaining youthful romantic-comedy with loads of action."

Soundtrack 

The soundtrack of the film was composed by Anup Rubens. The audio CDs are released into the market through Puri Sangeet. The audio launch of the film held in Bangkok on 9 January 2014.

References

External links 
 

2014 films
2010s Telugu-language films
2010s romantic action films
Indian romantic action films
Films directed by Puri Jagannadh